The 2020 Champion of Champions (also known as the 2020 888sport Champion of Champions for the purposes of sponsorship) was a professional snooker tournament that took place between 2 and 8 November 2020 at the Marshall Arena in Milton Keynes, England. It was the tenth Champion of Champions event, the first of which was held in 1978. The tournament featured 16 participants, primarily winners of important tournaments since the 2019 Champion of Champions. As an invitational event, the Champion of Champions tournament carries no world ranking points.

Neil Robertson was the defending champion, having defeated Judd Trump 10–9 in the 2019 final.

Robertson made the final again, but lost 10–6 to Mark Allen, who won the tournament for the first time.

On the first day, John Higgins made his 800th career century, although he lost the match to Ding Junhui.

Prize fund 
 Winner: £150,000
 Runner-up: £60,000
 Semi-final: £30,000
 Group runner-up: £17,500
 First round loser: £12,500
 Total: £440,000

Qualification 
Qualification for the 2020 Champion of Champions event was primarily determined by the winners of 20 tournaments over a one-year period, from the 2019 Champion of Champions to the ranking event edition of the 2020 Championship League, thereby including tournaments from both the 2019–20 and 2020–21 snooker seasons. The runner-up in the 2020 World Championship was also included. The field consisted of 16 players but with some players winning more than one qualifying event, there were less than 16 qualifying players. The remainder of the field was determined by the highest ranking player, not already qualified, at the time it was certain that a place would not be taken by a winner of the qualifying events. The first player to receive an entry this way was Mark Allen, who was ranked 5th after the 2020 European Masters (2020–21 season). The second player to receive an entry this way was John Higgins, who was ranked 8th after the 2020 English Open. The third and final player to receive an entry this way was David Gilbert, who was ranked 11th after the 2020 Championship League.

{|class="wikitable" span = 50 style="font-size:85%;
|-
|style="background:lightgrey": #cfc;" width=10|
|Player also qualified by winning a higher categorized event
|}

Main draw

Final

Century breaks
A total of 31  were made during the tournament.

 141, 139, 121, 121, 115, 109, 108, 104, 101, 100  Neil Robertson
 138, 119, 117, 112, 107, 103  Judd Trump
 137, 137, 131  Mark Selby
 130  Kyren Wilson
 125, 119, 110, 105, 104, 102, 102, 101  Mark Allen
 111  John Higgins
 107  David Gilbert
 107  Michael Holt

References

External links 
 

2020
2020 in snooker
2020 in English sport
Sport in Milton Keynes
Champion of Champions